The 1904 Montana gubernatorial election was held on November 8, 1904.

Incumbent Democratic Governor Joseph Toole was re-elected, defeating Republican nominee William Lindsay and Socialist nominee Malcolm G. O'Malley with 53.79% of the vote.

General election

Candidates
Joseph Toole, Democratic, incumbent Governor
William Lindsay, Republican, former state legislator, former Chairman of the Republican state committee
Malcolm G. O'Malley, Socialist, solicitor, former state legislator

Results

References

Bibliography
 
 
 

1904
Montana
Gubernatorial